James Gray (born April 14, 1969) is an American film director and screenwriter. Since his feature debut Little Odessa in 1994, he has made seven other features including  We Own the Night (2007), Two Lovers (2008), The Immigrant (2013), The Lost City of Z (2016), Ad Astra (2019), and Armageddon Time (2022). Five of his films have competed for the Palme d'Or at the Cannes Film Festival.

Early life
Gray was born in New York City and grew up in the neighborhood of Flushing. He is of Russian Jewish descent, with grandparents from Ostropol, Western Ukraine, which at that time was a part of the USSR. The original family name was "Grayevsky" or "Greyzerstein."  His father was once an electronics contractor. Gray attended the University of Southern California School of Cinematic Arts, where his student film, Cowboys and Angels, helped him get an agent and the attention of producer Paul Webster, who encouraged him to write a script which he could produce.

Career

1990s 
In 1994, at age 25, Gray made his first feature film Little Odessa, starring Tim Roth as a hit man confronted by his younger brother upon returning to his hometown, "Little Odessa," a section of Brighton Beach, Brooklyn. The film won the Silver Lion at the 51st Venice International Film Festival.

In 1998, Gray began shooting his second film, The Yards, a crime drama set in the commuter rail yards in New York City. The film was released theatrically by Miramax two years later on October 12, 2000.

2000s 
In March 2006, Gray began production on his third film, We Own the Night, which he had been wanting to shoot since the early 2000s. Set in 1988, it stars Joaquin Phoenix and Mark Wahlberg as two brothers, one a nightclub manager with ties to the mob, and the former a police detective who wages an all-out war on drugs. The film screened in competition at the 2007 Cannes Film Festival in May, receiving widely divergent reviews from international critics, and was released theatrically in the U.S. in October.

After that film's success, Gray was given creative freedom for Two Lovers which was loosely based on Fyodor Dostoevsky’s "White Nights". The film made its premiere at that year's Cannes Film Festival.

2010s 

Gray co-wrote the screenplay for Guillaume Canet's film Blood Ties, a remake of the French thriller Rivals. This collaboration with Canet led Gray to meeting his wife Marion Cotillard, whom he would cast in his next film The Immigrant. It tells the story of a nurse from Poland who immigrates to America, is separated from her sister at Ellis Island and forced into prostitution by a theater manager, played by Joaquin Phoenix. The film, which was previously titled Lowlife and The Nightingale, marked Gray’s fifth collaboration with Phoenix. It was nominated for the Palme d'Or at the 2013 Cannes Film Festival. 

In 2015, Gray directed a television commercial for Chanel men's fragrance, Bleu de Chanel, starring Gaspard Ulliel. It was filmed in Los Angeles and released on February 5, 2015. 

In October 2016, Gray's film The Lost City of Z premiered at the New York Film Festival. The film, based on the book by David Grann, depicts the life of explorer Percy Fawcett, played by Charlie Hunnam. 

While at the 2016 Cannes Film Festival promoting The Lost City of Z, Gray announced plans to direct his long-gestated sci-fi space epic Ad Astra. Brad Pitt signed on to star in April 2017 and the rest of the cast joined later that year. Ad Astra premiered at the Venice Film Festival on August 29, 2019 and was theatrically released in the United States on September 20, 2019 by 20th Century Fox. Gray later stated that the film that was released to theaters wasn't his cut.

2020s 
On June 17, 2020, it was officially confirmed that his next film, titled Armageddon Time, would be a coming-of-age drama story loosely based on Gray's childhood memories, with Anne Hathaway, Anthony Hopkins and Jeremy Strong cast in the film. The film had its world premiere at the Cannes Film Festival on May 19, 2022 and was released in the United States on October 28, 2022 by Focus Features.

Unrealized and upcoming projects
After Little Odessa, Gray was offered the script for The Devil's Own by Brad Pitt, a friend of his. Gray turned it down and the film was ultimately directed by Alan J. Pakula.

In 1999, Gray was in talks to direct Brad Pitt and Jennifer Aniston in Waking Up in Reno for Miramax. The film was made three years later but without the involvement of Gray, Pitt or Aniston.

It was reported on September 18, 2000 that Gray would direct and co-write Edgardo Mortara, a film based on the widely documented 1858 kidnapping of the 6-year-old Jewish boy by the Papal police. Gray was to collaborate with writer Rob Eshman on the screenplay.
 
In 2003, it was rumored that Gray had written an adaptation of Philip K. Dick's novelette "Paycheck". Prior to John Woo being selected to direct, Brett Ratner was in talks. A film was released later that year, but Gray had no involvement.
 
In January 2011, it was reported that Gray would be directing a film adaptation of Mark Greaney's novel The Gray Man written by Adam Cozad. The project was first set up at New Regency. Brad Pitt was initially cast to star, but by October 2015 he and Gray were no longer involved with the film.

In April 2011, Jeremy Renner commissioned Gray to write a Steve McQueen biopic with Renner in the role under his production banner, The Combine. "I did it more or less as a favor to Jeremy and to honor Steve McQueen," Gray said. Heavily researched and based on two books by Marshall Terrill, Portrait of an American Rebel and The Life and Legend of a Hollywood Icon, the film was initially going to be directed by Ivan Zachariáš. "I got into [it] very seriously," said Gray, "I was spending a lot of time with Steve McQueen's ex-wife and sort of started to live the Steve McQueen thing and began to really get involved with the subject. And then I realized I can't get so attached." However, Gray stated in a 2013 interview that he may end up directing the film himself at some point.

In August 2013, it was announced that Warner Bros tapped Gray to write and direct White Devil, a film based on the life of John Willis.

On April 8, 2015, Variety reported that Gray was to executive produce and creatively supervise Hard Apple, an "adult-skewing" animated series inspired by New York-born author Jerome Charyn's Isaac Sidel novels.
 
In April 2018, MGM closed a deal for Gray to direct I Am Pilgrim, an adaptation of the espionage novel by Terry Hayes.
 
In April 2022, Gray announced plans to develop a miniseries about Norman Mailer based on J. Michael Lennon's biography Norman Mailer: A Double Life.

In October 2022, Gray said he was interested in wrangling back the cast for a semi-sequel to Armageddon Time, to focus solely on his mother, who was portrayed by Anne Hathaway. "The story goes in a very unexpected place," Gray added, "Because my father actually did achieve some financial success but wound up getting it all confiscated by the government when he got into legal trouble. At the same time, my mother found out she was dying. And so, it's going to be, I think, something about that period."

That same month, Deadline reported that Gray's next film would be a biopic for MadRiver Pictures about a young John F. Kennedy. In addition to directing, Gray will rewrite the script, which was originally penned by Samuel Franco and Evan Kilgore. It would depict how Kennedy became the 35th President of the United States, particularly focusing on his time in World War II where he saved his crew from a patrol boat that was sunk by a Japanese destroyer.
 
In November 2022, Gray revealed in an interview for Collider that a film he always wanted to make was an epic about the Russian Revolution called The Dream of a Thousand Men, but that it was unlikely to be made anytime soon, if at all, due to Vladimir Putin's invasion of Ukraine.

Gray also turned down the role played by Noah Taylor in Wes Anderson's The Life Aquatic with Steve Zissou. He did however appear in a brief cameo in a deleted scene from Love Jones.

Opera
In 2019, it was reported that Gray was to stage Mozart's The Marriage of Figaro, his first opera, at the Théâtre des Champs-Élysées in Paris that November. French fashion designer Christian Lacroix did the costumes for the production.

Personal life
Gray married Alexandra Dickson in 2005. The couple have three children.

Influences
Gray, who frequently cites his inspirations, mentioned Francis Ford Coppola, Claude Chabrol, Luchino Visconti, Jean Renoir, John Ford, François Truffaut, Stanley Kubrick, David Lean, Robert Bresson, Federico Fellini, Carl Theodor Dreyer, Michael Cimino, John Cassavetes, Martin Scorsese, William Friedkin, Akira Kurosawa, and Valerio Zurlini all as filmmakers who have influenced his work. His influences however, are not only limited to film as Gray also admitted he has taken influence from classical paintings as well as opera, specifically in the verismo tradition.

Mikhail Kalatozov's I Am Cuba (1964), Mervyn LeRoy's I Am a Fugitive from a Chain Gang (1932), Josef von Sternberg's The Scarlet Empress (1932), Clint Eastwood's Unforgiven (1992), Busby Berkeley's Gold Diggers of 1935 (1935), Richard Quine's Strangers When We Meet (1960), Ted Kotcheff's Wake in Fright (1971), Elia Kazan's A Streetcar Named Desire (1951) and America America (1963), Francesco Rosi's Hands over the City, Bernardo Bertolucci's The Conformist (1970), Werner Herzog's Aguirre, the Wrath of God and Fitzcarraldo (1982), Robert Altman's McCabe & Mrs. Miller (1971), Lina Wertmüller's Seven Beauties (1975), Ridley Scott's Blade Runner (1982), and Fritz Lang's Metropolis (1927).

In 2022, Gray participated in the Sight and Sound film polls. Held every ten years to select the greatest films of all time, contemporary directors were asked to select ten films of their choice. Gray chose the following, in no order:

 2001: A Space Odyssey (USA/UK, 1968)
 Citizen Kane (USA, 1941)
 The Godfather (USA, 1972)
 8½ (Italy, 1963)
 The Leopard (Italy, 1963)
 Ordet (Denmark, 1955)
 PlayTime (France, 1967)
 Raging Bull (USA, 1980)
 Tokyo Story (Japan, 1953)
 Vertigo (USA, 1958)

Filmography

As director

Other film work

Television

Awards and nominations

See also
Indiewood
New Hollywood

References

External links

James Gray - Chiaroscuro posted by KINO on Vimeo
James Gray on AllMovie

1969 births
20th-century American screenwriters
21st-century American screenwriters
American male screenwriters
American people of Ukrainian-Jewish descent
Film directors from New York City
Jewish American screenwriters
Living people
People from Flushing, Queens
Screenwriters from New York (state)
USC School of Cinematic Arts alumni
Writers from Queens, New York